Long Beach Transit (LBT) is a municipal transit company providing fixed and flexible bus transit services in Long Beach, California, United States, in other communities in south and southeast Los Angeles County, and northwestern Orange County. Long Beach Transit also operates the Passport shuttle, Aquabus, and Aqualink. The service, while operated on behalf of the City of Long Beach, is not operated directly by the city (such as is done with the bus service operated by the City of Santa Monica), but by a separate nonprofit corporation, the Long Beach Public Transportation Company, operated for that purpose.

Long Beach Transit receives its operating revenue from farebox receipts and state tax revenue distributed by the Los Angeles County Metropolitan Transportation Authority.

History 
Long Beach Transit began operation in 1963 with the acquisition of Long Beach City Lines and Long Beach Motor Bus Company from National City Lines. The primary service area of Long Beach Transit has been the city of Long Beach and to a limited extent the enclave city of Signal Hill, but it has also provided service to surrounding communities in Los Angeles County, including Lakewood, Cerritos, Norwalk, and Seal Beach in neighboring Orange County.

The company has operated various types of bus services. During the 1970s and 1980s, it also ran small shuttle buses in the downtown area, called DASH (for Downtown Area Short Hops), and because the routes were shorter, the fare was lower than on the regular buses.

Transfers 

Originally, bus transfers could be obtained upon payment of $0.05 for local transfers, and $0.10 for "interagency transfers", which allow transfer to another bus line without additional payment (except for express service). Throughout the 1970s and early 1980s, instead of using a common transfer with the route number punched on the transfer, each route had its own transfer with the route number printed on them. For transfers to other bus lines, Long Beach Transit used the consolidated Los Angeles County interagency transfer, which every bus company in Los Angeles County except RTD (now Los Angeles County Metropolitan Transportation Authority) and Orange County Transit District (now Orange County Transportation Authority) used (both RTD and OCTD regular transfers worked for both their own buses and as an interagency transfer). The consolidated interagency transfer used by all the other transit agencies even had a check box naming the twelve bus companies in the county, and the driver would punch the box for the particular agency that issued the transfer. During the mid-1970s (sometime between 1972 and 1976), for a period of six months, a special subsidy was available. All bus trips in Los Angeles County were reduced from approximately $0.80 to $1.25, to $0.25 on weekdays and Saturdays, and $0.10 on Sunday (bus trips outside the county were subject to the regular rate). As a result, the issuance of transfers was discontinued for all trips within Los Angeles County. When the subsidy ended, the old price returned and bus companies resumed issuing transfers.

In the early 1980s, the company changed its transfer system. Instead of using books of transfers, every bus has a ticket printer, which issues the three types of transfers: regular transfers, which allow the user to transfer to a different route; "emergency" transfers (typically used if the customer becomes sick and has to get off the bus), which allow the user to get back on the same route; and interagency transfers, which allow the user to transfer to a different bus company (and gave the user an additional 1 hour of time before it expires), such as Orange County Transit, RTD (now LA Metro), Norwalk Transit and Cerritos Transit (now Cerritos on Wheels) buses. In case of machine failure, however, operators would still carry one book of each kind of transfers.

Effective in 1999, Long Beach Transit instituted a day pass, and on July 1, 2005, it eliminated transfers within the system, although the interagency transfer is available for transfers to other transit systems.

Water taxis 
In addition to regular service, Long Beach Transit operates two year-round water taxi services: the 49-passenger AquaBus, and the 75-passenger AquaLink, which connects the major attractions of Downtown Long Beach, including the Aquarium of the Pacific, Long Beach Cruise Terminal, and the  hotel.

AquaBus 
The 49-passenger AquaBus has six "ports of call": Dock 4 of the Aquarium of the Pacific, Queen Mary, Shoreline Village at Larry H. Parker's Lighthouse, Catalina Landing, Dock 7 of Pine Avenue Circle, and Hotel Maya. The fare is $1.

AquaLink 
The AquaLink is a 68-foot catamaran that ferries up to 75 passengers to the most popular attractions in Long Beach Harbor and on to Alamitos Bay Landing. The fare is $5, and wheelchair boarding is available at Dock 4 near the Aquarium of the Pacific and at the Queen Mary.

Regular service

History 
Originally, Long Beach Transit operated its bus lines as a consecutive set of route numbers, from 1 to 18. The numbers had no significance except that route 1 ran along State Route 1, the Pacific Coast Highway. (This is the same number currently used by the Orange County Transit Authority for its route that runs on Route 1.) Some routes had more than one routing; for example, the number 9 route ran from Downtown along 7th Street to California State University, Long Beach. All of the route 9 buses would continue along Bellflower Boulevard, whereupon one would terminate at Bellflower and Stearns Street; one would turn at Willow Street and continue along Woodruff Avenue; another would continue on Bellflower all the way to Alondra Boulevard; and another would also continue to Alondra but take a slight detour to the Lakewood Center shopping mall.

Possibly due to the successful renumbering which RTD had done in 1983, Long Beach Transit also decided to renumber its routes. In the mid-1980s, the company changed some of its route numbers, keeping the original 1- or 2-digit number and adding a single digit after the number. This was done to routes which split and serviced multiple streets and destinations. The route 9, as indicated above, was renumbered into routes 91, 92, 93, and 94, based on the street and destination while routes that only served one street and destination remained the same with their original 1 or 2 digit route number, example Line 1 which still remains. Additional routes have since been added, generally using the same system. For example, if a route extends part of an existing route, it takes the first one (or two) digits of the major route number, then adds a new additional digit on the end. This is why there is now a route 96, which did not exist at the time of the original route 9.

On August 16, 2021, Long Beach Transit announced they would be extending their services to Carson with three new routes. They are set to launch on September 19, 2021. At the moment, Long Beach Transit is focusing on the middle tier, which would connect riders to major destinations in and around the city, including Harbor–UCLA Medical Center, Carson High School, Rancho Dominguez Preparatory School, CSUDH, Metro A Line Wardlow and Del Amo stations, Carson Community Center/City Hall, and SouthBay Pavilion.

Current routes

Decommissioned routes

Fleet 
As of 2018, Long Beach Transit's fleet is composed of mostly New Flyer buses, which are the GE40LF, GE40LFA, XN40, and XN60 models. It also has a large number of Gillig BRT+ models, a decreasing number of New Flyer D40LF models, and one Prévost coach used for charters. It also uses the battery-powered BYD K9 buses, which are mainly used for the Passport zero-fare service.

Long Beach Transit has had several major firsts. It was the first agency to:
 Operate the General Motors RTS bus in the late 1970s, in addition to other variants
 Operate the first gasoline-electric buses in the world
 Use the first Gillig bus powered by CNG

The buses have four-digit numbers, of which the first two digits represent the year the bus was put into service. Buses numbered 90## (the ## representing number in fleet) entered service in the 1990s, 20## - 29## entered service in the 2000s, and 12## - 18## entered service in the 2010s.

Long Beach Transit buses are operated out of 2 yards:
Headquarters
Jackson Transit Center
Most buses are stored at the headquarters on Anaheim Street. The articulated buses are stored at the Jackson Transit Center bus depot in Paramount, CA. Both bus depots are located on Cherry Avenue.

Active fleet

Retired fleet

References

Further reading

External links 

Official website
Long Beach Transit bus routes and descriptions

Bus transportation in California
Transportation in Long Beach, California
Transportation in Los Angeles
Public transportation in Los Angeles County, California
Zero-fare transport services
1963 establishments in California